Daniel Hooper (15 September 1893 – 1973) was an English footballer who played as a centre-half in the Football League for Oldham Athletic.

Hooper was born in Newton Aycliffe. His family were from Rise Carr in Darlington, where his father worked in the rolling mills. His uncle, Charlie Roberts, played for England and Manchester United. His brothers, Bill, Mark and Carl, were all professional footballers, and his sisters, Sarah and Bessie, played for Darlington Quaker Ladies.

He played for Darlington Rise Carr before joining Oldham Athletic during the 1919–20 season. He made five League appearances before moving to Shildon Athletic. He later returned to 	Darlington Rise Carr and went on to play for Darlington Wednesday. He had a trial at Lincoln City during the 1927–28 season. In 1928, he was the subject of controversy when he played for two clubs, beyond his registration.

References

1893 births
1973 deaths
People from Newton Aycliffe
Footballers from Darlington
English footballers
Association football central defenders
Oldham Athletic A.F.C. players
Shildon A.F.C. players
English Football League players